The Stalking Moon is a 1968 American Western film in Technicolor directed by Robert Mulligan and starring Gregory Peck and Eva Marie Saint. It is based on the novel of the same name by T.V. Olsen.

Plot
U.S. Army soldiers round up a group of Indians, mostly women and children. Surprisingly, they find among them a white woman and her half-Indian son.

Sam Varner (Gregory Peck) is a scout retiring from the Army to his ranch in New Mexico. He agrees to escort Sarah Carver (Eva Marie Saint) and her son after she begs him. She wants to leave immediately rather than wait five days for a military escort.

Sam takes them to a stage coach stop called Hennessy. The boy runs away during the night. Varner and Sarah go looking for him as a dust storm begins. They find the boy and then hole up (literally) to wait out the storm.

When they return to the station, everyone there is dead, killed by the boy's Indian warrior father, Salvaje (played by Nathaniel Narcisco). Salvaje is greatly feared even among his own people - and with good reason: he is known to be a silent and ruthless killer. Salvaje means "Ghost" in Apache, or in their own tongue: "He Who Is Not Here", meaning a dead man.

Sam is upset that Sarah's impatience to leave has cost the people at the station their lives. When the stagecoach does arrive, Sam puts Sarah and her son on it and follows them to a rail station called Silverton. He trades government letters of transport for train tickets to Topeka, Kansas.

After some careful consideration, Sam decides to invite Sarah and her son to accompany him to his ranch where she can cook for him and an old man, Ned (played by Russell Thorson), who takes care of the ranch. Sam sells his horse and they take the train to New Mexico.

They uneasily try to coexist. Sarah and her son are not talkative despite Sam's best efforts. His friend Nick, a half-breed scout he has been friends with for ten years, shows up. Nick tells him that Salvaje killed everyone at Silverton and even killed Sam's old horse. It's apparent that Salvaje is coming to the ranch to retake his son.

Ned goes outside to feed his dog and finds it killed with an arrow. In a blind rage, he runs into the trees after Salvaje. Sam tries to bring him back, but can't find him. Shortly after, he hears Ned's death scream. Sam decides to go after Salvaje and create an opportunity for Nick to get a clear shot. But, when Sam is being tracked, Nick jumps up to warn him and Salvaje kills him. Nick dies in Sam's arms.

Salvaje enters the ranch house through a window. Sam blows out the kerosene lamp in order to hide in a dark corner. Sam shoots at him with a rifle and Salvaje flees, but he leaves a trail of blood.

Sam trails him and steps into a booby-trap that Salvaje has rigged with a knife. Sam is stabbed in the left thigh and bleeds profusely enough that he has to apply a tourniquet. The two men fight and eventually Sam shoots Salvaje three times as the warrior falls atop him, dying.

Sam manages to walk, stumble, and crawl back to the house, where Sarah rushes out to help him.

Cast
 Gregory Peck as Sam Varner
 Eva Marie Saint as Sarah Carver
 Robert Forster as Nick Tana
 Noland Clay as Boy
 Russell Thorson as Ned
 Frank Silvera as Major
 Lonny Chapman as Purdue
 Lou Frizzell as Stationmaster
 Henry Beckman as Sergeant Rudabaugh
 Charles Tyner as Dace
 Richard Bull as Doctor
 Sandy Brown Wyeth as Rachel
 Joaquín Martinez as Julio
 Boyd Morgan as Shelby
 Nathaniel Narcisco as Salvaje
 James Olson as Cavalry Officer

Production
The film marked the reunion between director Robert Mulligan, producer Alan J. Pakula and actor Gregory Peck, six years after their collaboration on To Kill a Mockingbird.

It was filmed on location in Red Rock Canyon, Nevada, Valley of Fire State Park, Nevada, and at the Samuel Goldwyn Studios in Hollywood.

Reception
Vincent Canby of The New York Times wrote "There are some lovely individual things in The Stalking Moon—broad, Western landscapes, a moment in which Miss Saint suddenly catches her haggard look reflected in a train window, a scene in which Peck buys a railroad ticket at a desert crossing that explains the awful, dislocating distances on the frontier. Those, however, are random touches...Like Peck, the film moves stolidly forward with more dignity than excitement...Quite consciously, Mulligan and Alvin Sargent, who wrote the screenplay, have kept their focus on the poor whites, but unfortunately, none of them is especially interesting. They remain outlines for characters — the lonely frontiersman, the woman who has gone through horrors that are unspeakable (at least unspeakable in this film) to survive Indian captivity, and the small boy torn between two cultures."

DVD
The Stalking Moon was released on DVD by Warner Home Video on August 26, 2008.

See also
 List of American films of 1968
 Ulzana's Raid, a western of 1972 concerning an elusive merciless Apache enemy but dealing with similar story elements in a more bleak and nihilistic manner.

References

External links
 
 
 
 
 

1968 films
1968 Western (genre) films
American Western (genre) films
Films about Native Americans
Films based on American novels
Films based on Western (genre) novels
Films directed by Robert Mulligan
Films scored by Fred Karlin
Films set in New Mexico
Films with screenplays by Alvin Sargent
1960s English-language films
1960s American films